D. Chad McCoy (born October 5, 1970) is a former Republican member of the Kentucky House of Representatives. He represented District 50 and served as the chamber's majority whip.

Personal life 
McCoy is an attorney and lives in Bardstown, Kentucky.

References

External links 
 Official website

Living people
1970 births
21st-century American politicians
21st-century American lawyers
Republican Party members of the Kentucky House of Representatives
People from Bardstown, Kentucky